Valentine George Crittall, 1st Baron Braintree,  (28 June 1884 – 21 May 1961) was a British politician and businessman who served briefly as a Labour Member of Parliament before later joining the Conservatives.

Background
Crittall was born at Braintree, the son of Essex businessman Francis Henry Crittall, founder of the Crittall window company, and Ellen Laura Carter. Crittall was educated at Framlingham College in Suffolk.

Political career
Crittall was elected as Labour Member of Parliament for the Essex constituency of Maldon in the 1923 general election by a majority of only 49 votes over the sitting Conservative MP Lt Col Edward Ruggles-Brise, and served as Parliamentary Private Secretary to Lord Thomson, the Minister of Air. He was defeated by Ruggles-Brise in the 1924 general election, and knighted in 1930. He was elevated to the peerage in 1948, as Baron Braintree, of Braintree in the County of Essex, and was a director of the Bank of England from 1948 to 1955. He was also a justice of the peace (magistrate) for Essex.

Silver End
In 1926, Crittall founded the model Village of Silver End, near Braintree in Essex. Built as a "garden village" to provide accommodation for the people who worked in the Crittall family's growing factories, the village has been described as "a wonder of its time": its motto is "Why not?"

Family
Crittall was married three times: to Olive Lillian MacDermott, in 1915; to Lydia Mabel Revy in 1933; and to Phyllis Dorothy Cloutman, in 1955. He died aged 76 in 1961, without male children, and his barony therefore became extinct.

Arms

References

 'Class Traitors': Conservative Recruits to Labour, 1900-30
 ThePeerage.com: Sir Valentine George Crittall, 1st and last Baron Braintree

External links 
 

 

1884 births
1961 deaths
Knights Bachelor
Crittall, Valentine
Conservative Party (UK) hereditary peers
Crittall, Valentine
UK MPs who were granted peerages
People from Braintree, Essex
Crittall, Valentine
Barons created by George VI